is a Japanese retired professional baseball player who played as a shortstop and is the current manager of the Saitama Seibu Lions. He is a switch-hitter.

Matsui signed with the New York Mets on December 17, 2003, becoming the first Japanese infielder to sign with a Major League Baseball team.

Early life
He graduated from the PL Academy Senior High School in Osaka, a school nationally renowned for its baseball program. The only appearance Matsui made at the National High School Baseball Championship Tournament was in his second year at PL Academy. Though Matsui was considered to be the PL Academy's ace starting pitcher, injuries limited him to playing only in the quarter-final game, where he allowed two runs during 2 innings.

Professional career

Seibu Lions
Matsui was chosen third overall by the Seibu Lions of Nippon Professional Baseball's Pacific League in the 1994 Japanese League Draft, where he would wear number 32. In 1996, his third season, he became a regular starter as a shortstop and finished the season second in stolen bases (50). Prior to the 1997 season, he would change his number to 7. The 1997 season saw him reach a .300 batting average for the first time and lead the league in stolen bases (62) to help his team win the Pacific League Title. During the 1997 All-Star Game he set a new All-Star Game record by stealing four bases and was chosen the game MVP. Matsui would lead the Pacific League in stolen bases for two more consecutive seasons.

Prior to joining MLB, Matsui would only play for the Seibu Lions, playing there from 1995 to 2003. He enjoyed success as a seven-time Best Nine award winner (1997–2003). One of his best years was 2002, when he had a .332 batting average with 36 home runs, 87 RBI, 193 hits, 119 runs, 46 doubles, 6 triples and 33 stolen bases. He received four Gold Glove awards while in Japan (equivalent of Rawlings Gold Glove Award in MLB) during the 1997, 1998, 2002 and 2003 seasons.  He also won a Nippon Professional Baseball MVP award in Japan during the 1998 season. Although Matsui experienced winning the Pacific League Title a total of four times (1994, 1997, 1998, 2002), his team never won the Japanese Series.

New York Mets
With the Mets, Matsui hit home runs in his first plate appearance in each of the 2004, 2005, and 2006 seasons. According to the Elias Sports Bureau, he is the only Major League player to hit a home run in his first plate appearance of his first three seasons. The only other player to hit a home run in even his first at-bat of three consecutive seasons was Ken Griffey Jr. In 2004, Matsui homered on the first pitch from Russ Ortiz of the Atlanta Braves leading off the first inning, in 2005, on the sixth pitch from Paul Wilson of the Cincinnati Reds with one out in the first inning, and in 2006, on the fourth pitch from Jake Peavy of the San Diego Padres with no outs in the top of the third. The third home run is notable for being an inside-the-park home run. He slid into home as his former Met teammate Mike Piazza was blocking the plate.

Matsui played 114 games in 2004 (the most games he has played so far in his MLB career). He hit .272 with 125 hits, 32 doubles, 2 triples, 7 home runs, 44 RBI, 65 runs, 14 stolen bases, 5 sacrifice hits, 40 walks and 182 total bases. His hits, doubles, home runs, RBI, walks, and total bases currently remain career highs.

Based on his performance in Japan, Matsui was expected to excel defensively as a shortstop with the Mets. However, in 2004, Matsui committed many errors and misjudgments at the position, and was made the second baseman for 2005. He was also plagued by injuries, which were not a problem for him in Japan. His offensive production was also much lower than anticipated. By mid-2005, he was no longer an everyday player, sharing time at second base with Miguel Cairo and Marlon Anderson. Matsui finished the season batting .255 with three home runs and 24 RBI.

Matsui began the 2006 season by hitting .200 (26-for-130) with 10 runs, six doubles, one home run and seven RBI. The one home run came on an inside-the-park home run against the San Diego Padres on April 20, 2006. Matsui became the first player since 1975 to hit an inside-the-park home run as his first home run of the season.

Colorado Rockies
On June 9, 2006, Matsui was traded to the Colorado Rockies for Eli Marrero. Colorado asked that Matsui waive certain clauses in his contract and he agreed. Once complete, Matsui was sent down to play with the Rockies' Triple-A affiliate, the Colorado Springs Sky Sox for about two and a half months. Matsui made his Rockies debut against the Milwaukee Brewers on August 23, 2006, starting at shortstop in place of Clint Barmes. Matsui would soon shift to second base. Through 2006 he improved from .200/.235/.269 (AVG/OBP/SLG) in his 130 at bats as a Met, to hitting .345/.392/.504 in 113 at bats as a member of the Rockies.

His stint in New York was punctuated with pronounced booing from Mets fans in response to his failure to validate high expectations gleaned from his (positionally) prodigious Japanese numbers.

Matsui re-signed with the Colorado Rockies for a one-year, $1.5M contract for 2007 and changed his number to 7, a number that he wore in Japan.

Matsui's performance improved during the 2007 season with the Rockies, as he hit .288, which was higher than his career average. He had career highs in runs (84), triples (6), stolen bases (32) and sacrifice hits (8) in 2007. Matsui was also first in the majors in scoring percentage (47%) when reaching base.

Matsui and the Rockies clinched the 2007 National League wild card game by winning a one-game regular season playoff matchup against the San Diego Padres, propelling Colorado into their second playoff appearance in club history.

Matsui hit his first career grand slam during the second game of the NLDS against the Philadelphia Phillies. It came with the Rockies down 3–2 with two outs in the top of the 4th inning. The grand slam gave the Rockies a lead in which they would never relinquish. Colorado won the game, 10–5. Matsui became only the third player in MLB history to have his first career grand slam occur in the postseason rather than the regular season. He also became the first Japanese player to hit a grand slam in the postseason. Along with the grand slam, Matsui hit a triple and a double during game two of the NLDS, falling a single short of becoming the only player in history to hit a cycle during the postseason. However, Matsui did become only the second player ever (Lou Brock in game four of the 1968 World Series was the first) to hit a double, triple and home run in a postseason game.

Houston Astros

On December 1, 2007, Matsui signed a three-year, $16.5-million deal with the Houston Astros.

Prior to Opening Day, Matsui underwent surgery to repair an anal fissure. He missed the first  weeks of the season. Matsui made his 2008 debut for the Astros on April 18. He posted a .293 batting average and a .354 on-base percentage with 20 stolen bases on the season.

Matsui still had injury problems but managed to keep the 2nd baseman starting position.
Matsui joined the exclusive list of baseball players with 2,000 hits or more lifetime. He has hit safely over 2,000 times in his Japanese career and in the MLB combined.

In 2009, he led all major league starting second basemen in range factor, at 5.33.

Matsui was released by the Houston Astros on May 19, 2010. In 71 at bats, Matsui managed only a .141 batting average with 1 RBI and 1 stolen base.

Colorado Rockies
Following his release he signed a minor league deal with the Colorado Rockies. He remained in the Rockies' minor league system for the remainder of the season.

Tohoku Rakuten Golden Eagles

After the 2010 season, Matsui signed with the Tohoku Rakuten Golden Eagles of Nippon Professional Baseball (NPB).

Saitama Seibu Lions
On November 17, 2017, Matsui signed with the Saitama Seibu Lions of Nippon Professional Baseball (NPB).

On September 27, 2018, he announced retirement after the season.

International career
He was selected Japan national baseball team at the 2003 Asian Baseball Championship and 2013 World Baseball Classic.

See also

Home run in first Major League at-bat

References

External links

Japanese league stats and info of Kazuo Matsui
THE GOLDEN PLAYERS CLUB (Japanese)
NPB.com

1975 births
Brooklyn Cyclones players
Colorado Rockies players
Colorado Springs Sky Sox players
Houston Astros players
Japanese expatriate baseball players in the United States
Living people
Major League Baseball second basemen
Major League Baseball shortstops
Major League Baseball players from Japan
New York Mets players
Nippon Professional Baseball outfielders
Nippon Professional Baseball second basemen
Nippon Professional Baseball shortstops
Nippon Professional Baseball MVP Award winners
Norfolk Tides players
People from Higashiōsaka
Round Rock Express players
Saitama Seibu Lions players
Seibu Lions managers
Seibu Lions players
Baseball people from Osaka Prefecture
St. Lucie Mets players
Tohoku Rakuten Golden Eagles players
2013 World Baseball Classic players